Melbourne Airport railway station is a proposed station on the planned Melbourne Airport railway line that will serve Melbourne Airport. It is scheduled to open in 2029.

Services and platform
The station is planned to be part of the Melbourne Airport rail link which connects with the Metro Tunnel. Trains will terminate at the airport before departing towards Sunshine, stations in the Melbourne CBD before becoming the Pakenham and Cranbourne lines.

References

Railway stations in Melbourne
Airport railway stations in Australia
Proposed railway stations in Melbourne